Pax Christi International is an international Catholic peace movement. The Pax Christi International website declares its mission is "to transform a world shaken by violence, terrorism, deepening inequalities, and global insecurity."

History

Pax Christi (Latin for Peace of Christ) was established in France in 1945 through the inspiration of Marthe Dortel-Claudot and Bishop Pierre-Marie Théas. Both were French citizens interested in reconciliation between French and German citizens in the aftermath of World War II.
Some of the first actions of Pax Christi were the organisation of kindness pilgrimages and other actions fostering reconciliation between France and Germany. Although Pax Christi initially began as a movement for French-German reconciliation, it expanded its focus and spread to other European countries in the 1950s. It grew as “a crusade of prayer for peace among all nations.”

Pax Christi was recognized as “the official international Catholic peace movement” by Pope Pius XII in 1952.

It also has chapters in the United States. In the 1960s, it became involved in Mississippi in organizing economic boycotts of businesses that discriminated against blacks, in an effort to support protesters in the civil rights movement, who were trying to end discrimination in facilities and employment. It was active in Greenwood, Mississippi, among other places.

In 1983, Pax Christi International was awarded the UNESCO Peace Education Prize.

The Pax Christi network membership is made up of 18 national sections and 115 Member Organizations working in over 50 countries.

Peace work
Pax Christi focuses on: human rights, human security, disarmament and demilitarisation, nonviolence, nuclear disarmament, extractives in Latin America, and a renewed peace process for Israel-Palestine.

Since 1988, the organisation gives out the Pax Christi International Peace Award to peace organisations and peace activists around the world.

Organization
Pax Christi is made up of national sections of the movement, affiliated organizations and partner organizations. Its International Secretariat is in Brussels. Pax Christi has consultative status as a non-governmental organization at the United Nations.

International presidents 

Maurice Feltin (1950–1965)
Bernard Alfrink (1965–1978)
Luigi Bettazzi (1978–1985)
Franz König (1985–1990)
Godfried Danneels (1990–1999)
Michel Sabbah (1999–2007)

In 2007, a co-presidency was created, a bishop and a lay woman.

Laurent Monsengwo (2007–2010)
Marie Dennis (2007–2019)
Kevin Dowling (C.SS.R.) (2010–2019)
Sr. Teresia Wamuyu Wachira, IBVM (2019–present)
 Marc Stenger (2019–present)

See also

Catholic peace traditions
Religion and peacebuilding
Pope Paul VI Teacher of Peace Award
 List of anti-war organizations

References

Further reading

External links
 
 Pax Christi Peace Stories
 Catholic Nonviolence Initiative

International Christian organizations
Peace organizations
Catholic lay organisations
Organizations established in 1945
Anti-nuclear organizations
International Campaign to Abolish Nuclear Weapons